The Zambia Hockey Association (ZHA) is the governing body of field hockey in Zambia. Its headquarters are in Kitwe, Zambia. It is affiliated to IHF International Hockey Federation and AHF African Hockey Federation.

Ms. Hazel Kennedy is the President of ZHA and Mr Thomas Mumba is the secretary.

History

See also
African Hockey Federation
Zambia women's national field hockey team

References

External links
 ZHA-FB
Zambia to host hockey tourney
Zambia Hockey requests for expat coach

Zambia
Hockey
Field hockey in Zambia